The 2019 Tianjin Open was a women's professional tennis tournament played on hard courts. It was the 6th edition of the tournament, and part of the 2019 WTA Tour. It took place at the Tuanbo International Tennis Centre in Tianjin, China between 7 and 13 October 2019.

Points and prize money

Point distribution

Prize money

1 Qualifiers prize money is also the Round of 32 prize money
* per team

Singles main-draw entrants

Seeds 

 1 Rankings are as of September 30, 2019

Other entrants 
The following players received wildcards into the singles main draw: 
  Duan Yingying
  Samantha Stosur  
  Yang Zhaoxuan

The following player received entry into the main draw through a protected ranking:
  Kateryna Bondarenko

The following players received entry from the qualifying draw:
  Kurumi Nara
  Arina Rodionova
  Wang Xiyu
  You Xiaodi

The following players received entry into the main draw as lucky losers:
  Ma Shuyue
  Wang Xinyu

Withdrawals 
Before the tournament
  Amanda Anisimova → replaced by  Kateryna Bondarenko
  Victoria Azarenka → replaced by  Jennifer Brady
  Hsieh Su-wei → replaced by  Heather Watson
  Sofia Kenin → replaced by  Wang Xinyu
  Elise Mertens → replaced by  Christina McHale
  Garbiñe Muguruza → replaced by  Anastasia Potapova
  Naomi Osaka → replaced by  Rebecca Peterson
  Alison Riske → replaced by  Zhu Lin
  Aryna Sabalenka → replaced by  Astra Sharma
  Sloane Stephens → replaced by  Kristie Ahn
  Iga Świątek → replaced by  Lauren Davis
  Zhang Shuai → replaced by  Ma Shuyue

Retirements 
  Kurumi Nara (right thigh injury)
  Wang Xinyu (low back injury)
  Zheng Saisai (left abdominal muscle injury)

Doubles main-draw entrants

Seeds 

1 Rankings are as of September 30, 2019

Other entrants 
The following pair received a wildcard into the doubles main draw:
  Ng Kwan-yau /  Zheng Saisai

The following pair received entry as alternates:
  Xu Shilin /  You Xiaodi

Withdrawals 
Before the tournament
  Wang Xinyu (low back injury)
  Zhang Shuai (right elbow injury)

During the tournament
  Yanina Wickmayer (right foot injury)

Champions

Singles 

  Rebecca Peterson def.  Heather Watson, 6–4, 6–4

Doubles 

  Shuko Aoyama /  Ena Shibahara def.  Nao Hibino /  Miyu Kato, 6–3, 7–5

References

External links 
 

Tianjin Open
Tianjin Open
Tianjin Open
Tianjin Open